Amy Alcott (born February 22, 1956) is an American professional golfer and golf course designer. She became a member of the LPGA Tour in 1975, and won five major championships and 29 LPGA Tour events in all. She is a member of the World Golf Hall of Fame. She was a part of the architectural team that designed the golf course for the 2016 Summer Olympics in Rio de Janeiro.

Professional career
Alcott was born in Kansas City, Missouri, and is Jewish. 

She won the U.S. Girls' Junior in 1973, She turned pro in 1975 at age 18, directly upon graduating from Palisades High School in Pacific Palisades, Los Angeles. Her first victory came in her third start as a professional at the Orange Blossom Classic on the LPGA Tour. She went on to be named LPGA Tour Rookie of the Year. Alcott won four tournaments in a year three times, in 1979, 1980, and 1984. Her best year came in 1980, when in addition to those four victories she also won the LPGA Vare Trophy for lowest scoring average, finished second five times and was in the Top 10 in 21 out of 28 tournaments played.

Alcott's first major championship victory came at the 1979 Peter Jackson Classic (later renamed the du Maurier Classic). She went on to win the U.S. Women's Open in 1980 and the Nabisco Dinah Shore in three times, in 1983, 1988, and 1991. The 1991 Nabisco Dinah Shore was her final victory on the LPGA Tour. After her win at the 1988 Dinah Shore, Alcott initiated what is now a tradition of the winner leaping into Poppie's Pond to celebrate.

That win was the 29th of her career. At the time, the LPGA Hall of Fame required at least 30 career wins for entry. Alcott chased for the 30th win in vain over the next several years. In 1999, the LPGA switched to a points-based criteria under which Alcott gained admission and she was inducted into the World Golf Hall of Fame. 

Alcott is also a member of the National Jewish Museum Sports Hall of Fame, and the Southern California Jewish Sports Hall of Fame.

From 2002 to 2004, the Office Depot Championship Hosted by Amy Alcott was a part of the LPGA Tour. 

Following the end of her touring days, Alcott started working in golf course design and also hosted a satellite radio program. She has written an instructional book and taped an instructional video.  

In July 2007, Alcott accepted the position as girls' golf coach at Harvard-Westlake School in North Hollywood, California.

Professional wins (33)

LPGA Tour wins (29)

1Co-sanctioned by the LPGA of Japan Tour

LPGA Tour playoff record (4–5)

LPGA of Japan Tour wins (3)
1978 Mizuno Japan Classic1
1980 Pioneer Cup
1981 Mitsukoshi Ladies Open
1Co-sanctioned by the LPGA Tour

Other wins (2)
1981 Mr. Goodwrench Invitational (with Larry Nelson) 
1986 Mazda Champions (with Bob Charles)

Legends Tour wins (1)
2019 ANA Inspiration Legends Day

Major championships

Wins (5)

Results timeline
Results not in chronological order before 2015.

^ The Women's British Open replaced the du Maurier Classic as an LPGA major in 2001.
^^ The Evian Championship was added as a major in 2013.

CUT = missed the half-way cut.
WD = withdrew
"T" = tied

Summary

Most consecutive cuts made – 31 (1983 Nabisco Dinah Shore – 1990 U.S. Women's Open)
Longest streak of top-10s – 5 (1979 du Maurier Classic – 1981 LPGA)

Team appearances
Professional
Handa Cup (representing the United States): 2006 (winners), 2007 (winners), 2008 (winners), 2009 (winners), 2010 (winners)

See also
List of golfers with most LPGA major championship wins
List of golfers with most LPGA Tour wins
List of Jewish golfers

References

External links
 
 
 Amy Alcott at jewishsports.net
 
 National Jewish Sports Hall of Fame Induction of Amy Alcott
 Amy Alcott at Jewish Women Encyclopedia

American female golfers
LPGA Tour golfers
Winners of LPGA major golf championships
World Golf Hall of Fame inductees
Jewish golfers
Jewish American sportspeople
Golfers from Missouri
Golfers from Santa Monica, California
International Jewish Sports Hall of Fame inductees
1956 births
Living people
21st-century American Jews
21st-century American women